The Dalton tradition is a Late Paleo-Indian and Early Archaic projectile point tradition.  These points appeared in most of Southeast North America around 10,000–7,500 BC.  

"They are distinctive artifacts, having concave bases with "ears" that sometimes flare outward (Fagan 2005)." These tools not only served as points but also as saws and knives.  They were often changed in form and function because the hunters would sharpen the points over and over and would eventually turn them into knives then chisels or scrapers.  A variant on the Dalton point is the Hardaway point of North Carolina.

References
Fagan, Brian.  Ancient North America.  Thames & Hudson Ltd: London. 2005

External links 
  Dalton Tradition in No Carolina
  Site showing Dalton points

Archaeology of the United States
Archaic period in North America
Paleo-Indian period
Projectile points